The Native American settlement of Turkeytown (Cherokee: "Gun'-di'ga-duhun'yi"), sometimes called "Turkey's Town", was named after the original founder of the settlement, the Chickamauga Cherokee chief, Little Turkey. At one point in history, this seemingly inconspicuous village stretched for approximately 25 miles along both banks of the Coosa River, and became the largest of the contemporary Cherokee towns.

Turkeytown was the original site of the US military outpost of Fort Armstrong established in October of the year 1813 as an ongoing protection for the area, and originally garrisoned entirely by Cherokee soldiers.

History
Turkeytown was settled in 1788. The town was established by Little Turkey during the Cherokee–American wars as a refuge for him and his people from the hostilities then being engaged in between the Cherokee and the American frontiersmen. 

On October 3, 1790, John Ross, who became Principal Chief of the Cherokee Nation from 1828–1866, was born here, to parents Daniel Ross, an immigrant Scots trader and his Cherokee wife, Mollie McDonald. 

The town was facing attack by the Red Stick Indians (a hostile faction of the Creek) during the Creek War in October 1813. Turkeytown chief, and Principal Chief of the Cherokee, Pathkiller, asked Andrew Jackson for help. Jackson responded by dispatching a detachment, led by General James White and including many Cherokee soldiers, to relieve the town.

Today
Much of the original site of Turkeytown is now underwater, due to the impoundment of the Coosa River which formed Lake Weiss. The current day community of Turkey Town in Etowah County, Alabama is less than ten miles southwest of Centre, Alabama and near the original site of the town.

See also
 The Battle of Horseshoe Bend
 Treaty of Turkeytown

Notes

Cherokee Nation (1794–1907)
Chickamauga Cherokee
Cherokee towns in Tennessee
Native American history of Tennessee
Former Native American populated places in the United States